Colaxes horton is a species of spider of the genus Colaxes. It is endemic to Sri Lanka. The species was first found from Horton Plains, hence its specific name.

References

Salticidae
Endemic fauna of Sri Lanka
Spiders of Asia
Spiders described in 2004